Dusty Hughes may refer to:
Dusty Hughes (playwright) (born 1947), British dramatist
Dusty Hughes (baseball) (born 1982), American baseball player